In political philosophy, the right of revolution (or right of rebellion) is the right or duty of a people to "alter or abolish" a government that acts against their common interests or threatens the safety of the people without cause. Stated throughout history in one form or another, the belief in this right has been used to justify various revolutions, including the American Revolution, French Revolution, the Russian Revolution, and the Iranian Revolution.

History

Early examples

Ancient China
To justify their overthrowing of the earlier Shang Dynasty, the kings of the Zhou Dynasty (1122–256 BCE) of China promulgated the concept known as the Mandate of Heaven, that Heaven would bless the authority of a just ruler, but would be displeased and withdraw its mandate from a despotic ruler. The Mandate of Heaven would then transfer to those who would rule best. Chinese historians interpreted a successful revolt as evidence that the Mandate of Heaven had passed on. Throughout Chinese history, rebels who opposed the ruling dynasty made the claim that the Mandate of Heaven had passed, giving them the right to revolt. Ruling dynasties were often uncomfortable with this, and the writings of the Confucian philosopher Mencius (372–289 BCE) were often suppressed for declaring that the people have the right to overthrow a ruler that did not provide for their needs.

Ancient Rome

The populist leader Tiberius Gracchus tried to justify depriving power from tribune Marcus Octavius by arguing that a tribune "stands deprived by his own act of honours and immunities, by the neglect of the duty for which the honour was bestowed upon him". For Gracchus, he "who assails the power of the people is no longer a tribune at all".

He strengthened his argument by highlighting the precedent of the overthrow of Tarquin the Proud "when he acted wrongfully; and for the crime of one single man, the ancient government under which Rome was built was abolished forever." As historian Edward Gibbon observes, after Tarquin's overthrow, "the ambitious Roman who should dare to assume their title or imitate [Tarquin's] tyranny was devoted to the infernal gods: each of his fellow-citizens was armed with the sword of justice; and the act of Brutus, however repugnant to gratitude or prudence, had been already sanctified by the judgement of his country."

After the death of Augustus, the soldier Percennius fomented mutiny in the legions of Pannonia. Believing they had the right to violently rebel to get better treatment and greater appreciation from the state, he rhetorically asked the common soldiery why they submitted to the centurions while military life entailed such low pay and so many years in service. Many soldiers shared his feelings. According to the historian Tacitus, "The throng applauded from various motives, some pointing to the marks of the lash, others to their grey locks, and most of them to their threadbare garments and naked limbs."

The Praetorian Subrius Flavus justified his right of revolution against Emperor Nero on the grounds that Nero's crimes meant he no longer deserved the love of the people: "I began to hate you when you became the murderer of your mother and your wife, a charioteer, an actor, and an incendiary."

In 285 C.E., Maximian suppressed a rebellion of Gallic peasants violently resisting exploitation by their masters. These fought for their natural rights against the miserable conditions they were placed under. Gibbon says that they "asserted the natural rights of men, but they asserted those rights with the most savage cruelty".

Medieval Europe

One example of the emergence of a right of revolution can be traced back to Þorgnýr the Lawspeaker, who in 1018 had a dramatic confrontation with the King of Sweden. The lawspeaker claimed the King of Sweden was accountable to the people and would be overthrown by them if he continued with his unpopular war with Norway. 

Another example is Magna Carta, an English charter issued in 1215, which required the King to renounce certain rights and accept that his will could be bound by the law. It included a "security clause" that gave the right to a committee of barons to overrule the will of the King through force if needed. Magna Carta directly influenced the development of parliamentary democracy and many constitutional documents, such as the United States Constitution. The Golden Bull of 1222 was a golden bull, or edict, issued by King Andrew II of Hungary. The law established the rights of Hungary's noblemen, including the right to disobey the King when he acted contrary to law. The Golden Bull is often compared to Magna Carta; the Bull was the first constitutional document of the nation of Hungary, while Magna Carta was the first constitutional charter of the nation of England.

Thomas Aquinas also writes about the right to resist tyranny in the Summa Theologica. He considers a law not to be a law at all, but an act of violence, if it contradicts either human or Divine good, overextends the power of the lawgiver, or hampers different parts of society unequally. For Aquinas, overthrowing a tyrant does not make a population seditious. Rather, the tyranny of tyrants means they commit "sedition", by which Aquinas means disturbance of those who work together lawfully for the good of the multitude:

Nicole Oresme, in his Livre de Politiques, categorically denied any right of resistance. John of Salisbury advocated direct revolutionary assassination of unethical tyrannical rulers in his Policraticus.

Early modern Europe

Theological notions of the right of revolution were elaborated in the early modern period. The Jesuits, especially Robert Bellarmine and Juan de Mariana, were widely known and often feared for advocating resistance to tyranny and often tyrannicide—one of the implications of the natural law focus of the School of Salamanca.

John Calvin believed something similar. In a commentary on the Book of Daniel, he observed that contemporary monarchs pretend to reign "by the grace of God", but the pretense was "a mere cheat" so that they could "reign without control". He believed that "Earthly princes depose themselves while they rise up against God", so "it behooves us to spit upon their heads than to obey them". When ordinary citizens are confronted with tyranny, he wrote, ordinary citizens have to suffer it. But magistrates have the duty to "curb the tyranny of kings", as had the Tribunes of the Plebs in ancient Rome, the Ephors in Sparta, and the Demarchs in ancient Athens. That Calvin could support a right of resistance in theory did not mean that he thought such resistance prudent in all circumstances. At least publicly, he disagreed with the Scottish Calvinist John Knox's call for revolution against the Catholic Queen Mary I Tudor of England.

The Catholic Church shared Calvin's prudential concerns – the Pope condemned Guy Fawkes' Gunpowder Plot, and Regnans in Excelsis was widely considered to be a mistake. Instead, the safest course of action for the people was to endure tyranny for as long as it could be borne, rather than run the larger risks of armed revolution.

The right of revolution was expounded by the Monarchomachs in the context of the French Wars of Religion, and by Huguenots thinkers who legitimized tyrannicides.

In the last chapter of The Prince, Niccolò Machiavelli exhorts the Medici family to take up violent insurrection "to liberate Italy from the barbarians". He explains why contemporary circumstances justify the Medici's right of revolution:

Philosophical views

John Locke

Perhaps no other major philosopher wrote as much about the right of revolution as Enlightenment thinker John Locke. He developed the concept in his Two Treatises of Government, especially the last two chapters, "Of Tyranny" and "Of the Dissolution of Government". The right formed an important part of his social contract theory, in which he defined the basis of social relationships. Locke said that under natural law, all people have the right to life, liberty, and private property; under the social contract, the people could instigate a revolution against the government when it acted against the interests of citizens, to replace the government with one that served the interests of citizens. In some cases, Locke saw revolution as an obligation. For him, the right of revolution acted as a safeguard against tyranny.

Locke defended the right of revolution in Two Treatises of Government in this way:

For Locke, these governments undid themselves by standing in the way of a citizen's right to property. He believed that "governments are dissolved" when "they endeavour to invade the property of the subject", since it is the right of the people to "choose and authorise a legislative" and accompanying institutions that act "as guards and fences to the properties of all society". In other writings, he used the analogy of a robber to explain why tyrannical infringement on property makes for unjust law: "Should a robber break into my house, and, with a dagger at my throat, make me seal deeds to convey my estate to him, would this give him any title? Just such a title by his sword has an unjust conqueror who forces me into submission. The injury and the crime is equal, whether committed by the wearer of a crown or some petty villain." Thus, according to Locke, if a government acts against a citizen's right of property, that citizen may exercise his right of revolution against that government.

Locke drew on the Old Testament story of Hezekiah's rebellion against the King of Assyria to make the case that God supported any people rebelling against unrighteous rule, saying that "it is plain that shaking off a power which force, and not right, hath set over any one, though it hath the name of rebellion, yet it is no offence before God, but that which He allows and countenances".

Like Aquinas, Locke believed that the truly seditious or rebellious individuals are not those who change the legislative to ensure public wellbeing, but the despots who violated public wellbeing in the first place with their illegitimate laws: "For when men, by entering into society and civil government, have excluded force, and introduced laws for the preservation of property, peace, and unity among themselves, those who set up force again in opposition to the law, do rebellare – that is, bring back again the state of war, and are properly rebels". Also like Aquinas, Locke considered it just for a subject to disobey any ruler overextending his political power. In A Letter Concerning Toleration, he argued that "if the law, indeed, be concerning things that lie not within the verge of the magistrates authority, ... men are not in these cases obliged by that law, against their consciences."

However, Locke was not only a proponent of fighting tyranny through civil disobedience of unjust laws. He also suggested using violent insurrection in situations where an illegitimate centre of power, such as a rogue executive, has used force to subdue the supreme power in the land, that is, the legislature:

Jean-Jacques Rousseau

Later, Jean-Jacques Rousseau would be in agreement on Locke's point about force, stating in his work On the Origin of Inequality that:

Immanuel Kant

Not all Enlightenment thinkers supported the rebellion principle. Immanuel Kant would have strongly disagreed with Locke and Rousseau as regards the notion of there being any general principle of a right to revolution. He believed that "if the ruler or regent, as the organ of the supreme power, proceeds in violation of the laws, as in imposing taxes, recruiting soldiers, and so on, contrary to the law of equality in the distribution of the political burdens, the subject may oppose complaints and objections (gravamina) to this injustice, but not active resistance." He reaffirms this repeatedly in The Metaphysics of Morals, stating that "there is no right of sedition, and still less of revolution", the reason being that "it is only by submission to the universal legislative will, that a condition of law and order is possible." Moreover, Kant believed that any "forcible compulsion of [the dethronement of a monarch], on the part of the people, cannot be justified under the pretext of a right of necessity (casus necessitatis)".

John Stuart Mill
John Stuart Mill believed in a morally justifiable form of right to revolution against tyranny, placing him firmly in the tradition of Aquinas, Locke, and Rousseau. In his introduction to On Liberty, he gave an account of the historical limitation of kingly power by the multitude, a conflict he termed "liberty". This progress was sought "by obtaining a recognition of certain immunities, called political liberties or rights, which it was to be regarded as a breach of duty in the ruler to infringe, and which if he did infringe, specific resistance, or general rebellion, was held to be justifiable". On the question of tyrannicide, Mill came down firmly in favour of the virtue of "the act of a private citizen in striking down a criminal, who, by raising himself above the law, has placed himself beyond the reach of legal punishment or control, [since it] has been accounted by whole nations, and by some of the best and wisest of men, not a crime, but an act of exalted virtue".

Samuel Johnson

Scottish biographer James Boswell noted the literary critic Samuel Johnson's attack on the widespread assumption that "the King can do no wrong":

Boswell emphasised this sentence "with peculiar pleasure, as a noble instance of that truly dignified spirit of freedom which ever glowed in his heart". Johnson seemed to believe that some form of a right to revolution inhered in natural law. He considered "that in no government power can be abused long. Mankind will not bear it. If a sovereign oppresses his people to a great degree, they will rise and cut off his head. There is a remedy in human nature against tyranny, that will keep us safe under every form of government. Had not the people of France thought themselves honoured as sharing in the brilliant actions of Louis XIV, they would not have endured him; and we may say the same of the King of Prussia's people."

Use in history
Revolutionary movements subsequent to this, all drew on Locke's theory as a justification for the exercise of the right of revolution.

The Glorious Revolution
During the Glorious Revolution of 1688, the Parliament of England effectively deposed James II of England and replaced him with William III of Orange-Nassau, due to the former's unacceptable leanings towards absolutism and Catholicism. Although Locke's treatise was published the year after, his ideas were already widely current in the English political system at the time.

Although Locke claimed that his book's purpose was to justify William III's ascension to the throne, it has been argued that the bulk of the writing was instead completed between 1679 and 1680 during the Exclusion Crisis, which attempted to prevent James II from ever taking the throne in the first place. Anthony Ashley-Cooper, 1st Earl of Shaftesbury, Locke's mentor, patron and friend, introduced the bill, but it was ultimately unsuccessful. Alternatively, the work is better associated with the revolutionary conspiracies that swirled around what would come to be known as the Rye House Plot.

The American Revolution
The right to revolution played a large part in the writings of the American revolutionaries in the run up to the American Revolution. Thomas Paine's political tract Common Sense used the concept as an argument for rejection of the British monarchy and separation from the British Empire, as opposed to merely self-government within it. The right was also cited in the Declaration of Independence of the United States, written by Thomas Jefferson, two thirds of which consists of a list of the wrongs committed by King George III which violated the colonist's natural right to life, liberty, and property. According to the declaration:

However, the Revolution did change course to set certain limits on the right of rebellion. In Federalist No. 28, Alexander Hamilton successfully made the case for a federal standing army, in opposition to Locke's principle that a republican government rules not by violence, but by law. Hamilton thought:

Simply put, "An insurrection, whatever may be its immediate cause, eventually endangers all government." However, Hamilton did point out that the wide geography of the United States meant that a federal army could not provide absolute limitation on the right of revolution, since, "If the federal army should be able to quell the resistance of one State, the distant States would have it in their power to make head with fresh forces."

The French Revolution
The right of revolution was also included in the 1793 preface to the French Constitution of 1793 during the French Revolution. This preface from 24 June 1793 contained a declaration of the rights of man and citizen including right to rebellion in §35: "When the government violates the rights of the people, insurrection is for the people, and for every portion thereof, the most sacred of rights and the most indispensable of duties."

First American Civil War
The inherent (rather than constitutional) right to revolt was cited in the year prior the civil war's start as justifying the secession of the Confederate States of America.

Nature of the right

Individual or collective right
Although some explanations of the right of revolution leave open the possibility of its exercise as an individual right, it was clearly understood to be a collective right under English constitutional and political theory.

As Pauline Maier has noted in her study From Resistance to Revolution, "private individuals were forbidden to take force against their rulers either for malice or because of private injuries". Instead, "not just a few individuals, but the 'Body of the People' had to feel concerned" before the right of revolution was justified and with most writers speaking of a whole people who are the Public', or the body of the people acting in their 'public Authority', indicating a broad consensus involving all ranks of society".

In the second of his Two Treatises of Government, John Locke quotes the jurist William Barclay as stating "That particular men are allowed ... to have no other remedy but patience; but the body of the people may with, with respect, resist intolerable tyranny, for when it is moderate they ought to endure it."

Right versus duty
Some philosophers argue that it is not only the right of a people to overthrow an oppressive government but also their duty to do so. Howard Evans Kiefer opines, "It seems to me that the duty to rebel is much more understandable than that right to rebel, because the right to rebellion ruins the order of power, whereas the duty to rebel goes beyond and breaks it."

Morton White writes of the American revolutionaries, "The notion that they had a duty to rebel is extremely important to stress, for it shows that they thought they were complying with the commands of natural law and of nature's God when they threw off absolute despotism." The U.S. Declaration of Independence states that "when a long train of abuses and usurpations, pursuing invariably the same Object evinces a design to reduce them under absolute Despotism, it is their right, it is their duty, to throw off such Government" (emphasis added). The phrase "long train of abuses" is a reference to John Locke's similar statement in the Second Treatise of Government, where he explicitly established overthrow of a tyrant as an obligation. Martin Luther King Jr. likewise held that it is the duty of the people to resist unjust laws.

Preconditions

In philosophical discourse
Certain theories of the right of revolution impose significant preconditions on its exercise, sometimes limiting its invocation to the most dire circumstances. Aristotle insisted that "men of rank" who "excel in virtue have the best right of all to rebel". Although Plato argued that a dissident should openly criticise his nation's policies, "provided that his words are not likely either to fall on deaf ears or to lead to the loss of his own life", he also stipulated against seemingly necessary violent insurrection: "force against his native land he should not use in order to bring about a change of constitution, when it is not possible for the best constitution to be introduced without driving men into exile or putting them to death".

Thinkers often emphasise the great responsibility in taking hold of the right to revolution. Aquinas believed that would-be revolutionaries held no right to rebel against a tyrant if "the tyrant's rule be disturbed so inordinantly that his subjects suffer greater harm from the consequent disturbance than from the tyrant's government". Michel de Montaigne was equally cautious, warning that "to establish a better regimen in the stead of that which a man has overthrown, many who have attempted it have foundered". Even the American Declaration of Independence admits that "Prudence, indeed, will dictate that governments long established should not be changed for light and transient causes".

In Leviathan, Thomas Hobbes argued that, since they have consented to invest their sovereign with the right of rulership, monarchical subjects can only change rulers with the original sovereign's permission. He states that "they that are subjects to a monarch cannot without his leave cast off monarchy and return to the confusion of a disunited multitude; nor transfer their person from him that beareth it to another man, or other assembly of men". Elsewhere he emphasises this point by saying that "the commands of them that have the right to command are not by their subjects to be censured nor disputed".

John Locke believed in the precondition that the right of violent insurrection could only be retained by those challenging tyranny, stipulating "that force is to be opposed to nothing but to unjust and unlawful force". The right of revolution only gave a people the right to rebel against unjust rule, not any rule: "whoever, either ruler or subject, by force goes about to invade the rights of either prince or people, and lays the foundation for overturning the constitution and frame of any just government, he is guilty of the greatest crime I think a man is capable of".

In Two Treatises of Government, Locke discusses the pro-monarchy philosopher William Barclay's notions about the preconditions for the right of revolution against a monarch: "First. He says it must be with reverence. Secondly. It must be without retribution or punishment; and the reason he gives is, 'because an inferior cannot punish a superior'." Locke disagreed with both these preconditions, explaining that it is impossible to strike against any opposition 'with reverence' and that an oppressor loses his superiority by being an oppressor. Elsewhere Barclay insists that a king must be dethroned as a precondition for the right of revolution against a monarchy: "The people, therefore, can never come by a power over him unless he does something that makes him cease to be a king", which may only happen if the king tries to overturn his kingdom or make his rule dependent on force provided by another country.

In his treatise Politics, Aristotle disapproves of the Cretan constitution's provision for the aristocratic right of revolution against the Cosmi, the ten most important magistrates in the country: "Worst of all is the suspension of the office of Cosmi, a device to which the nobles often have recourse when they will not submit to justice." For Aristotle, this is evidence of oligarchical interference codified into supposedly constitutional, republican government. In contrary to this view, the French Enlightenment thinker Montesquieu believed that this institution successfully hindered the abuse of power, thanks to the existing precondition of a powerful patriotism felt by the Cretans towards their island.

During the American Revolution

In the American Revolutionary context, one finds expressions of the right of revolution both as subject to precondition and as unrestrained by conditions. On the eve of the American Revolution, for example, Americans considered their plight to justify exercise of the right of revolution. Alexander Hamilton justified American resistance as an expression of "the law of nature" redressing violations of "the first principles of civil society" and invasions of "the rights of a whole people". For Thomas Jefferson, the Declaration was the last-ditch effort of an oppressed people—the position in which many Americans saw themselves in 1776. Jefferson's litany of colonial grievances was an effort to establish that Americans met their burden to exercise the natural law right of revolution.

Certain scholars, such as legal historian Christian Fritz, have written that with the end of the Revolution, Americans did not renounce the right of revolution. In fact they codified it in their new constitutions and even today 35 constitutions of American states have the same or similar provisions on the right of revolution as in the preamble of the American Declaration of Independence. For instance, constitutions considered to be "conservative", such as those of post-revolutionary Massachusetts in 1780, preserved the people's right "to reform, alter, or totally change" government not only for their protection or safety but also whenever their "prosperity and happiness require[d] it". This expression was not unusual in the early American constitutions. Connecticut's 1818 constitution articulated the people's right "at all times" to alter government "in such a manner as they may think expedient".

Fritz, in American Sovereigns: The People and America's Constitutional Tradition Before the Civil War, describes a duality in American views on preconditions to the right of revolution: "Some of the first state constitutions included 'alter or abolish' provisions that mirrored the traditional right of revolution" in that they required dire preconditions to its exercise. Maryland's 1776 constitution and New Hampshire's 1784 constitution required the perversion of the ends of government and the endangering of public liberty and that all other means of redress were to no avail. But in contrast, other states dispensed with the onerous preconditions on the exercise of the right. In the 1776 Virginia constitution the right would arise simply if government was "inadequate" and Pennsylvania's 1776 constitution required only that the people considered a change to be "most conducive" to the public welfare.

Natural law or positive law
Descriptions of the Right of Revolution also differ in whether that right is considered to be a natural law (a law whose content is set by nature and that therefore has validity everywhere) or positive law (law enacted or adopted by proper authority for governing of the state).

An example of the dual nature of the right of revolution as both a natural law and as positive law is found in the American revolutionary context. Although the American Declaration of Independence invoked the natural law right of revolution, natural law was not the sole justification for American independence. English constitutional doctrine also supported the colonists' actions, at least up to a point. By the 1760s, English law recognized what William Blackstone's Commentaries on the Laws of England called "the law of redress against public oppression". Like the natural law's right of revolution, this constitutional law of redress justified the people resisting the sovereign. This law of redress arose from a contract between the people and the king to preserve the public welfare. This original contract was "a central dogma in English and British constitutional law" since "time immemorial". The Declaration's long list of grievances declared that this bargain had been breached.

This well-accepted law of redress justified a people resisting unconstitutional acts of government. Liberty depended upon the people's "ultimate" right to resist. Unconstitutional commands breaching the "voluntary compact between the rulers and the ruled" could be "ignored" and arbitrary commands opposed with force. This right implied a duty on the part of the people to resist unconstitutional acts. As Alexander Hamilton noted in 1775, government exercised powers to protect "the absolute rights" of the people and government forfeited those powers and the people could reclaim them if government breached this constitutional contract.

The law of redress had limits like the right of revolution under natural law. The law of redress, like the right of revolution, was not an individual right. It belonged to the community as a whole, as one of the parties to the original constitutional contract. It was not a means of first resort, or response to trivial or casual errors of government. Blackstone's Commentaries suggested that using the law of redress would be "extraordinary", for example applying if the king broke the original contract, violated "the fundamental laws", or abandoned the kingdom. During the Stamp Act crisis of the 1760s the Massachusetts Provincial Congress considered resistance to the king justified if freedom came under attack from "the hand of oppression" and "the merciless feet of tyranny". A decade later the "indictment" of George III in the Declaration of Independence sought to end his sovereign reign over the colonies because he violated the original constitutional contract.

As explained in legal historian Christian Fritz's description of the role of the right of revolution in American Revolution, American independence was justified by conventional theories under Anglo-American constitutional thought at the time about the people's collective right to cast off an arbitrary king. "Both natural law and English constitutional doctrine gave the colonists a right to revolt against the sovereign's oppression." But these understandings about the right of revolution on the eve of the American Revolution rested on a traditional model of government. That model posited the existence of a hypothetical bargain struck in the mists of antiquity between a king and a people. "In this bargain, the people were protected by the monarch in exchange for the people giving the king allegiance. This was a contractual relationship. American revolutionaries accused George III of breaching his implied duty of protection under that contract, thereby releasing the people in the colonies from their allegiance. The sovereign's breach of the hypothetical contract gave rise to the subjects' right of revolutiongrounded on both natural law and English constitutional doctrine."

Examples as positive law
Although many declarations of independence seek legitimacy by appealing to the right of revolution, far fewer constitutions mention this right or guarantee this right to citizens because of the destabilizing effect such a guarantee would likely produce. Among the examples of an articulation of a right of revolution as positive law include:

Modern relevance
Some have argued that because in modern times democratic governments can be overthrown by popular vote, the right of the people to remove the government has become embedded into the political system. In a study of the idea of rule by the people in the American Revolution and in early post-revolutionary America, legal historian Christian G. Fritz writes:

However, events such as the Arab Spring provide evidence that the revolutionary period of history has not necessarily ended. This raises the question of the importance of right of revolution in the 21st century. As terrorism is gaining recognition as a crime under international law, the concept of right to revolution is seen as a legal mechanism to distinguish terrorists from freedom fighters.

See also

Citizen suit
Civil resistance
Confederation (Poland)
Political corruption
Qui tam
Regulatory capture
Right to protest

References

External links

Locke and the Social Order
The Founders Constitution, Vol. 1 Chapter 3, Right of Revolution
North Carolina Constitution of 1789

Political concepts
Collective rights
Enlightenment philosophy
Popular sovereignty
Control (social and political)
Revolution